Plocama putorioides is a species of flowering plant in the family Rubiaceae. It is endemic to the Socotra archipelago of Yemen. Its natural habitat is subtropical or tropical dry shrubland.

References

External links
World Checklist of Rubiaceae

Endemic flora of Socotra
putorioides